Geghhovit is a village in the Martuni Municipality of the Gegharkunik Province of Armenia.

Etymology 
The village is also known as Geghahovit, and was known as Verin Gharanlugh until 1968.

History 
The village was founded in the 15th century. The village contains the roofless St. Gevorg Church, built in 1873. The church has some older khachkars built into its walls and is surrounded by a medieval cemetery. There is also a modern small gray basalt Tukh Manuk chapel in the southern half of the village. Both buildings are located just off the main highway through the village.

Gallery

References

External links 

 
 

Populated places in Gegharkunik Province
Populated places established in the 3rd century